Granite Mountain Hotshots Memorial State Park is a state park near Yarnell, Arizona, created to memorialize the nineteen members of the Granite Mountain Hotshots who died there on June 30, 2013, while fighting the Yarnell Hill Fire.

The park opened on November 30, 2016, and had over 18,000 visitors in its first year. The park, located at the site where the firefighters died, is accessed by a  hiking trail from the parking area off Arizona State Route 89.

History
The park was authorized by House Bill 2624 introduced into the Arizona House of Representatives on February 11, 2014, and signed into law by Governor Jan Brewer on April 30, 2014. Planning by the Yarnell Hill Memorial Site Board began in late November. By April 2015, the board decided to purchase the land for the park. Planning for the trail to reach the site began soon thereafter. Arizona Public Service donated $229,000 towards the construction of the trail.

In January 2016, workers from the American Conservation Experience began work on the main trail. Construction of a small parking lot at the trail head began in March, followed by the memorial gabion baskets. Most of the work was finished that summer, with "final placement of benches and interpretive signs" occurring in October and November. A dedication ceremony was held on November 29, 2016, led by Governor Doug Ducey and state senators Steve Pierce and Karen Fann. The park opened to the public the following day.

Description
The memorial is made of 19 rock baskets or gabions connected by chains forming a circle around the fatality site. It is surrounded by a pathway and includes a flagpole. Along the trail to the site are 19 granite memorial plaques, each with a photo of a hotshot and a short biography. There are also memorial benches along the trail.

The memorial plaques are embedded into rock formations along the trail, one approximately every  and are arranged in order of the seniority of the crew. It is steep and rugged with over 200 steps carved into rock and several switchbacks.

Hotshot crew

See also
 List of Arizona state parks

References

State parks of Arizona
Parks in Yavapai County, Arizona
2016 establishments in Arizona
Monuments and memorials in the United States
Firefighting memorials
Protected areas established in 2016